Autopsy (original Italian title Macchie solari, also known as The Victim and Corpse) is a 1975 Italian giallo-horror film directed by Armando Crispino. It achieved a cult status for its truculent morgue scenes.  The Italian title translates as Sunspots.

Plot
During a rash of unusual suicides in Rome that scientists theorize are being caused by sunspots, a young female morgue doctor (Mimsy Farmer) is told by a priest that he thinks his sister was murdered, although he is being told it was suicide. They team up to investigate the cause of his sister's death.

Cast 
 Mimsy Farmer: Simona Sana 
 Barry Primus: Father Paul Lenox 
 Ray Lovelock: Edgar 
 Carlo Cattaneo: Lello Sana 
 Angela Goodwin: Daniela 
 Gaby Wagner: Betty Lenox 
 Massimo Serato: Gianni Sana 
 Ernesto Colli: Ivo  
 Antonio Casale: Inspector Silvestri

Critical reception 
Allmovie wrote, "This creepy whodunit [...] offers a few chills but is ultimately unsatisfying."

Marco Giusti feels that the film, like all films by Crispino, is a little slow, a little boring.

Rob Talbot wrote "You really do wonder what you’ve let yourself [in] for when this one kicks off, but it’ll certainly make you sit up and pay attention, whether you love or hate it."

References

External links

Autopsy at Variety Distribution

1975 films
Italian horror films
1975 horror films
Films scored by Ennio Morricone
1970s Italian-language films
1970s Italian films